Mongicual District is a district of Nampula Province in north-eastern Mozambique. The principal town is Mogincual.

Further reading
District profile (PDF) 

Districts in Nampula Province